Brisbane is a surname. Notable people with the surname include:

 Abbott Hall Brisbane (1804–1861), American military officer, plantation owner, and author
 Albert Brisbane (1809–1890), American author and theorist
 Arthur Brisbane (1864–1936), American newspaper editor
 Charles Brisbane (1769–1829), British naval officer 
 James Brisbane (1774–1826), British naval officer
 Margaret Hunt Brisbane (1858–1925), American poet
 Patrick Brisbane (1926-1974), Australian Anglican priest
 Thomas Brisbane (1773–1860), Scottish soldier and Governor of New South Wales
 William Henry Brisbane (1806–1878), abolitionist